Andrea Heinemann Simon ( Heinemann; March 24, 1909 – February 15, 1994) was an American civil rights activist and the mother of singer Carly Simon.

Life and career
Andrea Louise Heinemann was born and raised in Philadelphia, the second child of Ofelia "Elma Marie" (Oliete/Ollright), known as "Chibie", and Frederick Adolph "Fred" Heinemann. Her father was of German descent. Her mother was born in Cuba, and was of pardo heritage, a freed-slave descendant (the show Finding Your Roots has tested her daughter Carly's DNA as 10% African and 2% Indigenous).

Heinemann married Richard Leo Simon (March 6, 1899July 29, 1960), co-founder of the publishing company Simon & Schuster, on August 3, 1934. At the time of their engagement, Heinemann worked as a receptionist for the company. 
They had four children:
former opera mezzo-soprano singer and New York real estate agent, Joanna Simon
Broadway score writer Lucy Simon
singer-songwriter Carly Simon
Peter Simon

The family resided in the Riverdale community of the Bronx.

Simon was actively involved in the civil rights movement and community work.  This included serving on the board of directors of the Riverdale Mental Health Association for over 30 years and the Riverdale Chapter of the United Nations Association.

In 1994, Simon died of lung cancer at her Riverdale home at the age of 84.

References

1909 births
1994 deaths
Activists for African-American civil rights
American people of Cuban descent
American people of German descent
Deaths from lung cancer in New York (state)
Movements for civil rights
Carly Simon
Simon family (publishing)